Pig Goat Banana Cricket is an American animated television series on Nickelodeon. Created by Dave Cooper and Johnny Ryan, the series follows the adventures of the eponymous characters Pig (Matt L. Jones), Goat (Candi Milo), Banana (Thomas F. Wilson), and Cricket (Paul Rugg). Most episodes present the escapades of the four characters separately until they meet at the end. The first season premiered on July 16, 2015. 

On June 25, 2015, it was announced that the series had been picked up for a second season of 14 episodes, ahead of the series premiere.

The first 20 episodes of the first season aired on Nickelodeon. For the remainder of season one and the entirety of season two, episodes aired on sister network Nicktoons. The show ended on August 11, 2018.

Series overview

Episodes
The episodes below are listed in the order they were originally broadcast.

Pilot (2012)

Season 1 (2015–16)

Season 2 (2016–18)
This season aired on Nicktoons.

References

Notes
 Production code information can be found at the following links:

External links
 

Lists of American children's animated television series episodes
Lists of Nickelodeon television series episodes